Gregory Charles Royal, also known as Chuck Royal, is an American musician, trombonist, composer, writer, co-founder of The BeBop Channel Corporation, the parent owner of JazzTimes. 
 founder of the New York Jazz Film Festival, a former judge on America's Hot Musician. and the former artistic director of the American Youth Symphony (AYS) in Washington, D.C.

Early life and education 
Royal is the son of biochemist and microbiologist husband and wife team Gladys W. Royal and George C. Royal, and grew up in Washington, DC. His brother Christopher Royal is also a jazz musician. Gregory received training on the trombone in the DC Youth Orchestra Program.  Royal also studied at the Duke Ellington School of the Arts.

As a student at Howard University, he received the 1982 DownBeat Magazine Student Music Award for Jazz Vocal Group: Graduate College Outstanding Performance in the Jazz Instrumental Soloist Category.  He graduated from Howard University with a Master of Music in Jazz Studies.

Career
As a 10th grader, Royal caught the attention of  drummer Art Blakey during Blakey's appearance at Blues Alley in Washington, DC. Blakey invited Royal to live with him in the summer of 1978 at his 45th Street Manhattan apartment and join his band The Jazz Messengers. Royal's association with Blakey was an indoctrination in the New York jazz scene and led to important engagements with the Collective Black Artist's (CBA) Ensemble. https://jazztimes.com/features/profiles/art-blakey-praise-the-messenger/4/

Royal played with the Duke Ellington Orchestra (1989–99), Art Blakey and The Jazz Messengers, Slide Hampton and his World of Trombones and Howard University Jazz Ensemble.  He has appeared onstage as a trombonist with the Broadway shows Five Guys Named Moe and Jelly's Last Jam.

Royal released the jazz album Dream Come True on the GCR Music Company label in 1979. It includes Clarence Seay on bass, Jeff Corbett on drums, Warren Taylor on flute and saxophone, and Geri Allen on piano.

The Dreamer, written by Royal and performed by Sarah Loverock, was certified Gold by the Canadian Recording Industry Association CRIA on November 4, 2009.

Royal has written, acted and performed in the musical theatre production It's a Hardbop Life. An early version of the show, co-written by Denise Bird, was performed in New York in 2001 and La Crosse in 2002. The story used a college basketball star seeking inspiration in jazz as the main character.  It's a Hardbop Life appeared as a special event at the New York JVC Jazz Festival in 2004. Revised versions have been presented at a number of venues including Mead Theatre Lab at Flashpoint in Washington, DC in 2010 and the Producers Club in New York in 2011. The most recent version of the show connects a hip-hop artist to his jazz-era father.  Royal has stated that "The mission of the (program) is to encourage the young hip-hop generation that instrumental music is integral and important today and not an ancient tradition of past decades." Royal is vocal about his concern for the future of music. He advocates that "artistic elites" desiring to save jazz and classical music should try to connect with (and educate) a younger hip-hop and MTV audience. Royal was commissioned by the DC Commission for the Arts and Humanities to produce the documentary To Rap or Play on the subject.

Royal has also written and appeared in the Off-Broadway production God Doesn't Mean You Get To Live Forever, presented in March 2012 at the Baruch Performing Arts Center,and in 2022 at Theatre Row on 42nd Street in New York. https://bfany.org/theatre-row/shows/god-doesnt-mean-you-get-to-live-forever/

Royal wrote and appeared in the short film World's Not for Me, in which he plays a jazz musician who awakens from a near 30 year coma to find a world he no longer recognizes musically, culturally or financially. The film won the Harlem Spotlight Best Narrative Short Award at the Harlem International Film Festival in September, 2016.

Royal along with his wife, Sue Veres Royal, is the co-founder and interim CEO of The BeBop Channel Corporation, ticker symbol BBOP, the first TV network focused solely on Jazz culture. which later expanded its mission to include dance, theatre and festival offerings after veteran journalist Steven Clemons joined the company as CEO  Royal is also founder of the New York Jazz Film Festival.

Most recently, The BeBop Channel acquired JazzTimes as part of its acquisition of Madavor Media on February 15, 2023.

References

Bibliography 
 Scott Harris, "Prince of the Pick up Picks Up The Pieces", Los Angeles Times, February 11, 1997 
 Leonard Feather, Biographical Encyclopedia of Jazz, Oxford University Press, 1999
 RPM Magazine, Volume 62, No. 10, October 9, 1995
 Life 1999 Universal Pictures

Howard University alumni
Living people
American jazz trombonists
Male trombonists
DC Youth Orchestra Program alumni
University of the District of Columbia alumni
21st-century trombonists
21st-century American male musicians
American male jazz musicians
Year of birth missing (living people)
21st-century African-American musicians